Edward Charles Mariner (3 January 1877 – 10 May 1949) was an English cricketer.

Mariner made a single first-class appearance for Hampshire in the 1896 County Championship against Warwickshire. Mariner made two ducks in the match and bowled eight wicketless overs.

Mariner died at Portsmouth, Hampshire on 10 May 1949.

External links
Edward Mariner at Cricinfo
Edward Mariner at CricketArchive

1877 births
1949 deaths
Cricketers from Winchester
Hampshire cricketers
English cricketers